Milk Cattle at the OK Corral (OK 목장의 젖소) is the fifth studio album of South Korean Rock Band Crying Nut. Thank to this album, Crying Nut successfully made their comeback to the mainstream and the indie scene simultaneously. "Luxembourg" and "Myeong-dong Calling" were hits.  "Whisper under the Water" is known as the song featured by Sim Soobong(심수봉) who was at the place where former Korean President Park, Jung-Hee was murdered. This song's writer is Crying Nut's guitarist Lee Sang-Myun's wife, and she gave this song to her husband as a present.

Track listing
Source:

Personnel 
 Park, Yoon-Sik – vocal, guitar
 Lee, Sang-Myun – guitar
 Han, kyung-Rok – bass
 Lee, Sang-Hyuk – drums
 Kim, In-Soo –  Accordion, Organ

References

External links

2006 albums
Korean-language albums